Aurora McKenney Pijuan (born November 11, 1949) is a Filipino beauty queen who was crowned Miss International 1970.

Biography
She comes from Bacolod and is a graduate of Saint Scholastica's College (batch 1967). A product of the 1970 Binibining Pilipinas beauty pageant, Aurora was sent to Osaka, Japan to compete, and eventually win, Miss International 1970. Her victory paved the Philippines to become the first country to win consecutively twice.

Pijuan went on to marry golfer and basketball coach Tomas Manotoc. The couple have two children, Mavis and Tomas Jr. ("TJ"). Manotoc obtained a divorce from Pijuan in the Dominican Republic and married Imee Marcos, daughter of then Philippine president Ferdinand Marcos, on December 4, 1981.

In 1984 Philippine parliamentary election, she failed to win a seat as assemblyman to the Batasang Pambansa for Makati.

Pijuan is currently an active member of the Gawad Kalinga movement in the rural areas of the Philippines.

References

 https://web.archive.org/web/20061022074056/http://www.pathfinder.com/asiaweek/96/1011/feat6.html
https://web.archive.org/web/20061024194857/http://www.visayandailystar.com/2006/Starlife/2006/April/02/feature2.htm

1949 births
Living people
Binibining Pilipinas winners
Miss International winners
People from Bacolod
Miss International 1970 delegates
St. Scholastica's College Manila alumni